Balboa Island is the eleventh studio album by the English rock band Pretty Things, released on Zoho Roots in 2007.

Track listing 
 "The Beat Goes On" (Phil May, Frank Holland, Mark St. John) – 4:14
 "Livin' in My Skin" (May, Holland) – 3:56
 "Buried Alive" (May, Holland) – 3:36
 "(Blues for) Robert Johnson" (May, Holland) – 8:00
 "Mimi" (Dick Taylor) – 2:35
 "Pretty Beat" (May, Taylor, Holland, St. John) – 2:52
 "The Ballad of Hollis Brown" (Bob Dylan) – 6:30
 "In the Beginning" (May, Holland) – 4:42
 "Feel Like Goin' Home" (Muddy Waters; arranged by the Pretty Things) – 2:39
 "Freedom Song" (Traditional; arranged by the Pretty Things) – 4:46
 "Dearly Beloved" (May, Jon Povey) – 5:00
 "All Light Up" (May, Holland, St. John) – 4:30
 "Balboa Island" (Holland) – 4:42

Personnel
Pretty Things
Phil May – vocals
Dick Taylor – lead guitars
Frank Holland – guitars, vocals
Wally Waller – bass, guitars, vocals
Jon Povey – keyboards, vocals
Skip Alan – drums, percussion
Studio musicians
 Mark St. John – ancient Trixon drums, vocals
Scarlett Wrench – additional vocals
James Cheetham – piano, organ on "(Blues for) Robert Johnson"
Rupert Cobb – trumpet
Duncan Taylor-Jones – extra vocals on "Dearly Beloved"

References

2007 albums
Pretty Things albums